Epichloë is a genus of ascomycete fungi forming an endophytic symbiosis with grasses. Grass choke disease is a symptom in grasses induced by some Epichloë species, which form spore-bearing mats (stromata) on tillers and suppress the development of their host plant's inflorescence. For most of their life cycle however, Epichloë grow in the intercellular space of stems, leaves, inflorescences, and seeds of the grass plant without incurring symptoms of disease. In fact, they provide several benefits to their host, including the production of different herbivore-deterring alkaloids, increased stress resistance, and growth promotion.

Within the family Clavicipitaceae, Epichloë is embedded in a group of endophytic and plant pathogenic fungi, whose common ancestor probably derived from an animal pathogen. The genus includes both species with a sexually reproducing (teleomorphic) stage and asexual, anamorphic species. The latter were previously placed in the form genus Neotyphodium but included in Epichloë after molecular phylogenetics had shown asexual and sexual species to be intermingled in a single clade. Hybrid speciation has played an important role in the evolution of the genus.

Epichloë species are ecologically significant through their effects on host plants. Their presence has been shown to alter the composition of plant communities and food webs. Grass varieties, especially of tall fescue and ryegrass, with symbiotic Epichloë endophyte strains, are commercialised and used for pasture and turf.

Taxonomy

Elias Fries, in 1849, first defined Epichloë as a subgenus of Cordyceps. As type species, he designated Cordyceps typhina, originally described by Christiaan Hendrik Persoon. The brothers Charles and Louis René Tulasne then raised the subgenus to genus rank in 1865. Epichloë typhina would remain the only species in the genus until the discovery of fungal grass endophytes causing livestock intoxications in the 1970s and 1980s, which stimulated the description of new species. Several species from Africa and Asia that develop stromata on grasses were split off as a separate genus Parepichloë in 1998.

Many Epichloë species have forms that reproduce sexually, and several purely asexual species are closely related to them. These anamorphs were long classified separately: Morgan-Jones and Gams (1982) collected them in a section (Albo-lanosa) of genus Acremonium. In a molecular phylogenetic study in 1996, Glenn and colleagues found the genus to be polyphyletic and proposed a new genus Neotyphodium for the anamorphic species related to Epichloë. A number of species continued to be described in both genera until Leuchtmann and colleagues (2014) included most of the form genus Neotyphodium in Epichloë. Phylogenetic studies had shown both genera to be intermingled, and the nomenclatural code required since 2011 that one single name be used for all stages of development of a fungal species. Only Neotyphodium starrii, of unclear status, and N. chilense, which is unrelated, were excluded from Epichloë.

Species

As of 2022, there are 37 accepted species in the genus, with 3 subspecies and 6 varieties described.  15 species, 3 subspecies and 5 varieties are haploid.  22 species and 1 variety are hybrids (allopolyploids). Several taxa are only known as anamorphic (asexual) forms, most of which have previously been classified in Neotyphodium.

Life cycle and growth

Epichloë species are specialized to form and maintain systemic, constitutive (long-term) symbioses with plants, often with limited or no disease incurred on the host. The best-studied of these symbionts are associated with the grasses and sedges, in which they infect the leaves and other aerial tissues by growing between the plant cells (endophytic growth) or on the surface above or beneath the cuticle (epiphytic growth). An individual infected plant will generally bear only a single genetic individual clavicipitaceous symbiont, so the plant-fungus system constitutes a genetic unit called a symbiotum (pl. symbiota).

Symptoms and signs of the fungal infection, if manifested at all, only occur on a specific tissue or site of the host tiller, where the fungal stroma or sclerotium emerges. The stroma (pl. stromata) is a mycelial cushion that gives rise first to asexual spores (conidia), then to the sexual fruiting bodies (ascocarps; perithecia). Sclerotia are hard resting structures that later (after incubation on the ground) germinate to form stipate stromata. Depending on the fungus species, the host tissues on which stromata or sclerotia are produced may be young inflorescences and surrounding leaves, individual florets, nodes, or small segments of the leaves. Young stromata are hyaline (colorless), and as they mature they turn dark gray, black, or yellow-orange. Mature stromata eject meiotically derived spores (ascospores), which are ejected into the atmosphere and initiate new plant infections (horizontal transmission). In some cases no stroma or sclerotium is produced, but the fungus infects seeds produced by the infected plant, and is thereby transmitted vertically to the next host generation. Most Epichloë species, and all asexual species, can vertically transmit.

The taxonomic dichotomy is especially interesting in this group of symbionts, because vegetative propagation of fungal mycelium occurs by vertical transmission, i.e., fungal growth into newly developing host tillers (=individual grass plants). Importantly, many Epichloë species infect new grass plants solely by growing into the seeds of their grass hosts, and infecting the growing seedling. Manifestation of the sexual state — which only occurs in Epichloë species — causes "choke disease", a condition in which grass inflorescences are engulfed by rapid fungal outgrowth forming a stroma. The fungal stroma suppresses host seed production and culminates in the ejection of meiospores (ascospores) that mediate horizontal (contagious) transmission of the fungus to new plants. So, the two transmission modes exclude each other, although in many grass-Epichloë symbiota the fungus actually displays both transmission modes simultaneously, by choking some tillers and transmitting in seeds produced by unchoked tillers.

While being obligate symbionts in nature, most epichloae are readily culturable in the laboratory on culture media such as potato dextrose agar or a minimal salts broth supplemented with thiamine, sugars or sugar alcohols, and organic nitrogen or ammonium.

Epichloë species are commonly spread by flies of the genus Botanophila. The flies lay their eggs in the growing fungal tissues and the larvae feed on them.

Evolution

The epichloae display a number of central features that suggest a very strong and ancient association with their grass hosts. The symbiosis appears to have existed already during the early grass evolution that has spawned today's pooid grasses. This is suggested by phylogenetic studies indicating a preponderance of codivergence of Epichloë species with the grass hosts they inhabit. Growth of the fungal symbiont is very tightly regulated within its grass host, indicated by a largely unbranched mycelial morphology and remarkable synchrony of grass leaf and hyphal extension of the fungus; the latter seems to occur via a mechanism that involves stretch-induced or intercalary elongation of the endophyte's hyphae, a process so far not found in any other fungal species, indicating specialized adaptation of the fungus to the dynamic growth environment inside its host. A complex NADPH oxidase enzyme-based ROS-generating system in Epichloë species is indispensable for maintenance of this growth synchrony. Thus, it has been demonstrated that deletion of genes encoding these enzymes in Epichloë festucae causes severely disordered fungal growth in grass tissues and even death of the grass plant.

Molecular phylogenetic evidence demonstrates that asexual Epichloë species are derived either from sexual Epichloë species, or more commonly, are hybrids of two or more progenitor Epichloë species.

Bioactive compounds

Many Epichloë endophytes produce a diverse range of natural product compounds with biological activities against a broad range of herbivores. The purpose of these compounds is as a toxicity or feeding deterrence against insect and mammalian herbivores. Ergoline alkaloids (which are ergot alkaloids, named after the ergot fungus, Claviceps purpurea, a close relative of the epichloae) are characterized by a ring system derived from 4-prenyl tryptophan. Among the most abundant ergot alkaloids in epichloë-symbiotic grasses is ergovaline, comprising an ergoline moiety attached to a bicyclic tripeptide containing the amino acids L-proline, L-alanine, and L-valine. Key genes and enzymes for ergot alkaloid biosynthesis have been identified in epichloae and include dmaW, encoding dimethylallyl-tryptophan synthase and lpsA, a non-ribosomal peptide synthetase.

Another group of epichloë alkaloids are the indole-diterpenoids, such as lolitrem B, which are produced from the activity of several enzymes, including prenyltransferases and various monooxygenases. Both the ergoline and indole-diterpenoid alkaloids have biological activity against mammalian herbivores, and also activity against some insects.  is a pyrrolopyrazine alkaloid thought to be biosynthesized from the guanidinium-group-containing amino acid L-arginine, and pyrrolidine-5-carboxylate, a precursor of L-proline, and is an insect-feeding deterrent. One gene required for peramine synthesis –  – was found by Tanaka et al., 2005. The loline alkaloids are 1-aminopyrrolizidines with an oxygen atom linking bridgehead carbons 2 and 7, and are biosynthesized from the amino acids L-proline and L-homoserine. The lolines have insecticidal and insect-deterrent activities comparable to nicotine. Loline accumulation is strongly induced in young growing tissues or by damage to the plant-fungus symbiotum. Many, but not all, epichloae produce up to three classes of these alkaloids in various combinations and amounts. Recently it has been shown that Epichloë uncinata infection and loline content afford × Festulolium grasses protection from black beetle (Heteronychus arator).

Many species in Epichloë produce biologically active alkaloids, such as ergot alkaloids, indole-diterpenoids (e.g., lolitrem B), loline alkaloids, and the unusual guanidinium alkaloid, peramine.

Ecology

Effects on the grass plant

It has been proposed that vertically transmitted symbionts should evolve to be mutualists since their reproductive fitness is intimately tied to that of their hosts. In fact, some positive effects of epichloae on their host plants include increased growth, drought tolerance, and herbivore and pathogen resistance. Resistance against herbivores has been attributed to alkaloids produced by the symbiotic epichloae. Although grass-epichloë symbioses have been widely recognized to be mutualistic in many wild and cultivated grasses, the interactions can be highly variable and sometimes antagonistic, especially under nutrient-poor conditions in the soil.

Ecosystem dynamics

Due to the relatively large number of grass species harboring epichloae and the variety of environments in which they occur, the mechanisms underlying beneficial or antagonistic outcomes of epichloë-grass symbioses are difficult to delineate in natural and also agricultural environments. Some studies suggest a relationship between grazing by herbivores and increased epichloë infestation of the grasses on which they feed, whereas others indicate a complex interplay between plant species and fungal symbionts in response to herbivory or environmental conditions. The strong anti-herbivore activities of several bioactive compounds produced by the epichloae  and relatively modest direct effects of the epichloae on plant growth and physiology suggest that these compounds play a major role in the persistence of the symbiosis.

References

 
Hypocreales genera
Taxa named by Elias Magnus Fries
Taxa described in 1945